Bahrain School is a Department of Defense Education Activity (DoDEA) school located in Juffair, Manama, Bahrain.

Overview
The school is operated by the Bahrain International School Association (BISA) with the United States Department of Defense Education Activity (DoDEA) and takes students from Kindergarten to Twelfth grade. Graduating seniors can earn an American diploma or an International Baccalaureate diploma.

Bahrain School is the only DoDEA school in the Persian Gulf area. The closest DoDEA school to Bahrain School is George C. Marshall School in Ankara, Turkey. It provides education primarily to the children of the United States Navy stationed in Bahrain, but historically, about half of the student body has been local enrollment, usually the dependents of diplomatic personnel and ARAMCO employees, as well as wealthy Bahraini citizens. The Navy dependent population declined in July 2004 when dependents were sent home due to security concerns.  In July 2009, dependents were again authorized to return to Bahrain.

As of 2013, there were 435 total students enrolled in both the middle and high schools, with 69% of the students in grades 10 to 12. 57% of the students at the time were American citizens, with the remaining 43% representing approximately 68 countries.

Also as of 2013, the middle and high school employed forty-three teachers, seven supporting professionals, and seven support staff for a total of fifty-seven teachers and staff. Of those, eighteen were male and thirty-nine were female.

Accreditation
Bahrain School is accredited by the North Central Association of Colleges and Schools to offer an American diploma.  The College Board authorizes Bahrain School to offer Advanced Placement courses: Calculus AB, Microeconomics, Chemistry, Physics, and Spanish. On March 1, 1982, the school became the first in the Kingdom of Bahrain and the second in the Middle East after the American International School in Amman, Jordan in 1981, to offer the International Baccalaureate Diploma under the accreditation of the International Baccalaureate Organization.

Sports
Bahrain School has many of the sports that typical American schools have such as basketball, soccer, baseball, volleyball, track and field and cross country. The school competes against other schools on the island. Since the school is a part of DoDDS Europe, they also compete in the DODDS European championships.

Notable alumni
 Salman bin Hamad Al Khalifa, The Crown Prince of the Kingdom of Bahrain and the Deputy Supreme Commander of the Bahrain Defence Force.
 Brent Brandon, Outstanding Graduate from the United States Air Force Academy, Two-year winner of the National John F. Kennedy Fellowship - Harvard University, Winner of the Gilroy Award for Leadership and Flying - USAF Electronic Warfare Officer School, Nominated for Silver Star and awarded Distinguished Flying Cross for Heroism in Aerial Combat in EF-111 aircraft on first wave attack in Desert Storm; chairman of the Board - Boise Classical Academy
 Summer Bishil, American Independent Spirit Award-nominated actress.

See also

 List of schools in Bahrain

References

External links
 Bahrain School website

1967 establishments in Bahrain
International Baccalaureate schools in Bahrain
International schools in Bahrain
Education in Manama
Buildings and structures in Manama
Bahrain–United States relations
Department of Defense Education Activity
American international schools in Asia